Henlopen may refer to:

Cape Henlopen, Delaware, the southern cape of the Delaware Bay along the Atlantic coast of the United States
, a United States Navy minesweeper and tug in commission from January to March 1918